Geggus is a surname. Notable persons with the surname include:

Charlie Geggus (1862–1917), American baseball player
John Geggus (1889–1951), English footballer